Phi Chi Theta ( or PCT) is one of the largest co-ed professional business fraternities in the United States. Today, Phi Chi Theta comprises 41 collegiate and alumni chapters across the United States. While most chapters are now co-ed, there are some which have only women as members.

History
Phi Chi Theta was formed by the merger of two competing women's business fraternities in 1924. These six women became the founders of the fraternity: 

The meeting was hosted at the LaSalle Hotel (Bryan, Texas) and took over two days with the founding chapters to be New York Alpha (Columbia University), Colorado Alpha (University of Denver), New York Beta (New York University), Oregon Beta (University of Oregon), Gamma (Oregon State University), Delta (Northwestern University), Epsilon (University of Pittsburgh), and Zeta (Boston University).

Early organization
At first, chapters were only given to universities whose business school were members of the American Assembly of Collegiate Schools of Business. This was changed in Chicago at the 1934 Biennial Meeting where they decided to accept chapters in Rank A universities as long as the number of chapters from those school does not exceed twenty percent of the total number of Collegiate Chapters that existed. This were further changed in June 17-20th, 1948 at the twelfth Biennial Meeting located at the Willard Hotel. It was changed so that chapters in business schools of Rank A universities would not surpass forty percent of the total number of Collegiate Chapters. In Boston during the 1952 Biennial Meeting, this was again changed to accept chapters in universities accredited by the American Assembly of Collegiate Schools of Business or the Regional Accrediting Association as long as the courses of Business Administration is approved. In 1962, the last portion of the bylaw was changed to included study of Business or Economics making Phi Chi Theta the first professional fraternity for women in Economics.

The second Biennial Meeting was in New York at the Pennsylvania Hotel on June 18 to 19, 1926 with Mrs. James L Dohr as president. The chapters installed at this meeting were Eta (University of California, Berkeley), Iota (University of Wisconsin–Madison), Kappa (University of North Dakota), Lambda (University of Kansas), Mu (University of Utah), Nu (University of Indiana), Xi (University of Southern California), Omicron (University of Missouri), and Pi (University of Idaho).

The third Biennial Meeting took place at University of California's Stephens Building on June 21 to 26, 1928 with Helen Phillips as president. The chapters installed at this meeting were Rho (University of Nebraska–Lincoln), Sigma (University of Illinois Urbana), and Tau (Ohio State University).

The fourth Biennial Meeting took place in Boston, Massachusetts at the Hotel Vendome on June 20 to 24, 1930 with Ethel M. Allen as president. A single chapter was installed at this meeting, Upsilon (Georgia School of Technology).

The fifth Biennial Meeting took place in Denver, Colorado at the Brown Palace Hotel on June 24 to 28, 1932. No new chapters were installed in this meeting.

The sixth Biennial Meeting took place in Chicago at the Stevens Hotel on June 21at to 26th, 1934 with Elsa Mueller was president. During this meeting, a national scholarship was approved.

The seventh Biennial Meeting took place in Oregon at the Hotel Multnomah on June 22 to 25, 1936 with Ida Belle Tremayne as president. A single chapter was installed at this meeting, Phi (University of Colorado).

The eighth Biennial Meeting took place in Pittsburgh, Pennsylvania at the Hotel Schenley on June 16 to 20, 1938. The president was Nellie Jones and the chapters that was installed were Chi (University of Alabama), Psi (Brigham Young University), Omega (University of California, Los Angeles). Omega chapter was later changed to be called Alpha Alpha because Omega contained a negative meaning of "the end" for the members.

The ninth Biennial Meeting took place in Atlanta, Georgia at the Atlanta Biltmore Hotel on June 17 to 20, 1940. The president was Alma Martin and the lone chapter installed was Alpha Beta (Marquette University).

The tenth Biennial Meeting took place in Madison, Wisconsin at Hotel Loraine on June 18 to 22, 1942 with Phyllis Buck as president. No chapters were installed that year. Phi Chi Theta cancelled the scheduled 1944 biennial meeting due to World War II, but interestingly, Alpha Gamma (Southern Methodist University) was installed in 1944 through the mail.

The eleventh Biennial Meeting took place in Indiana at the French Lick Springs Hotel on June 27 to 30, 1946. The president was Ellen Hawley and no chapter was added at this meeting.

The twelfth Biennial Meeting took place in Washington D.C. at the Willard Hotel on June 17 to 19, 1948. The president was Althea Christenson and the chapters installed at this meeting were Alpha Delta (State College of Washington), Alpha Epsilon (University of Georgia), and Alpha Zeta (Montana State University).

The thirteenth Biennial Meeting took place in Chicago, Illinois at Hotel Ambassador East on June 15 to 17, 1950. The president was Claire O' Reilly and chapter Alpha Eta (Saint Louis University) was installed while Xi chapter became inactive.

Merger, and expansion
On July 27, 1973 Epsilon Eta Phi, a similar, but smaller fraternity merged into Phi Chi Theta.

At the time of merger, Epsilon Eta Phi had five active and two inactive chapters.  Its active groups were Alpha (Northwestern), Beta (DePaul), Delta (Duquesne day school), Epsilon (Duquesne night school), and Eta (Hardin-Simmons).  Its inactive chapters were Gamma (Boston) and Zeta (Beaver College (Arcadia)).

It appears that this merger was intended to provide continuity for alumnae; the Full History mentions initiation ceremonies held in Chicago (near Northwestern and DePaul) and in Pittsburgh (near Duquesne) for collegians and alumnae.  But the only new chapter that came about from the matter was Gamma Upsilon chapter at Duquesne, later in 1973.  's Northwestern members appear to have been absorbed into the  chapter there, and there was no further chapter formation or renaming of the existing groups at DePaul or Hardin-Simmons.

The official flower of Epsilon Eta Phi was the rose-colored sweet pea.  Its colors were steel gray and old rose, and its motto was "To be rather than to seem."  Its official publication was the Epsilon Eta Phi Magazine, issued annually.

Title IX
This change was prompted by Title IX, Federal legislation that led to similar moves by most professional and honor societies which were not already coeducational. Where previously men's and women's groups operated as cordial peers, each serving their own constituencies, rapid adoption of co-educational models led inadvertently to mergers and absorption of smaller groups. Phi Chi Theta survived to become one of the largest of the remaining business fraternities.

Chapter and alumnae club growth has continued for Phi Chi Theta in the subsequent decades.

Membership 
Phi Chi Theta's initiated membership includes three classes: Collegiate, Alumni, and Life Members. 

A Collegiate Member is an initiated member working towards an undergraduate bachelor's degree or a graduate student that is studying Economics or Business. Every pledge in a Collegiate Chapter has to go through a pledging period that can range anywhere from one month to one year. Every pledge receives a Pledge Pin at the beginning of pledging and it will be returned to the chapter at the end of the pledging period. Pledges need to pass a Pledge Test on materials in the official Pledge Manual in order to become an official member.

An Alumna or Alumnus (colloquially an "Alum") is an initiated member that has received a Bachelor's degree, or a Collegiate Member that is not currently studying in school.

A Life Member is an Alumni Member who has obtained a Life Membership in the Fraternity.

Chapters
Chapters of Phi Chi Theta include the following.  Those in bold are active, those in italics are inactive. Names in plain text are unused or of unknown status:

There are additionally a number of alumni chapters that have been formed.

National Honorary Members 
The Fraternity has occasionally awarded honorary membership.  These include:

See also
 Professional fraternities and sororities
 PFA

References

Student organizations established in 1924
Professional fraternities and sororities in the United States
Professional Fraternity Association
1924 establishments in Illinois